In astrology, a cusp (from the Latin for spear or point) is the imaginary line that separates a pair of consecutive signs in the zodiac or houses in the horoscope. 

Because the solar disc has a diameter of approximately half a degree, it is possible for the Sun to straddle the cusp as it moves across the sky. When this occurs at the moment of birth such a person is said to be "born on the cusp" and some believe that their life is influenced by the characteristics of both signs. For example, if an individual was born when the Sun (by convention the point at the centre of the Solar disc) was located at 29 degrees, 50 minutes Gemini, then one might say that they were born on the cusp of Gemini and Cancer.  Much of the Solar disc was actually in Cancer even though the centre was in Gemini.

Although the term "cusp" is universally used for the boundaries of signs, not all astrologers agree that an object can ever be included in more than one sign.  Many consider relevant only the location of the Sun's centre, which must be entirely in one sign, and would describe the natal Sun in the example as simply being in Gemini.  If late degrees of Gemini have a Cancer-like character, they would describe that as simply the nature of that part of Gemini rather than some influence spilling over from the next sign. In order to discover your true Sun placement, you must figure out your birth time. This will give you an accurate depiction of what sign the Sun was in the minute you were born; that will be your correct sign. 

On the other hand, astrologers who consider objects "on the cusp" to be meaningfully different from objects entirely in one sign may apply such a description even when no part of the object crosses the boundary.  That point of view may consider the Sun to be "on the cusp" even when its centre is as much as two degrees away from the sign boundary.  They may also call other objects (much less than half a degree in diameter) "on the cusp" despite no part of the object being in the adjacent sign.  Their claim is that the influence of the cusp gets weaker but does not suddenly disappear as the object gets further from the cusp.

A similar debate applies to cusps between houses.

References 

Technical factors of Western astrology